Rear Admiral Peter Tomlinson was a South 	African Navy officer.

He attended school at Diocesan College in Cape Town from 1936 until March 1941.

He joined the South African Air Force in World War II, serving in the motor boat flotilla. He only joined the SA Naval Forces (as the Navy was then known) as an Able Seaman in 1944. He was commissioned in 1945 and was one of sixty naval officers who joined the Permanent Force in 1946.

Senior Staff Officer Personnel in 1965. Ashore he served as Acting Director of Personnel and as South Africa’s attaché in Argentina as well as Chief of Naval Staff (Personnel) from 1 July 1974 and Chief of Naval Staff Operations from 1978 to 1982.

Honours and awards
He was awarded the Southern Cross Medal and the National Order of Merit (Paraguay)(Commander) and the Order of Naval Merit (Argentina).

 
 
 
 
  Commander of the National Order of Merit (Paraguay)
  Grand Officer Order of Naval Merit (Brazil)

References

South African admirals
2012 deaths
Alumni of Diocesan College, Cape Town